Sadie Jaffar Mohammed (born 19 August 1957) is an Iraqi boxer. He competed in the men's welterweight event at the 1980 Summer Olympics.

References

1957 births
Living people
Iraqi male boxers
Olympic boxers of Iraq
Boxers at the 1980 Summer Olympics
Place of birth missing (living people)
Welterweight boxers